Avitak, formerly AIDAvita, was the second ship in AIDA Cruises' fleet. Avitak was built in 2002 by the German shipyard Aker MTW in Wismar. She is identical to AIDAaura.
In June 2022, AIDA Cruises announced that the ship won't returning to service for AIDA Cruises.  and was sold to a new owner, which is currently unknown.

References

External links

Official AIDAvita website 

Ships built in Wismar
Ships of AIDA Cruises
2001 ships